InnerSpace is an  adventure video game developed by PolyKnight Games and published by Aspyr. It was  released worldwide on January 16, 2018, for Linux, Microsoft Windows, OS X, PlayStation 4, Nintendo Switch and Xbox One.

InnerSpace is the first title from PolyKnight Games. Inspired by the character-driven narratives of Journey  and Grow Home, development of InnerSpace was funded Kickstarter campaign.

The partnership between PolyKnight Games and Aspyr was announced at PAX East 2017.

Reception 
Innerspace received mixed to average reviews from critics.

References

External links
 

2018 video games
PlayStation 4 games
Xbox One games
Linux games
MacOS games
Video games developed in the United States
Windows games
Art games
Nintendo Switch games
Adventure games
Single-player video games
Aspyr games